The 2012 end-of-year women's rugby union tests is a series of women's rugby union matches. For the second year in a row, New Zealand toured the Northern Hemisphere by playing three test matches against England.
Black Ferns will try to revenge the double defeat suffered last year, when they were only able to get an 8–8 draw on final test day.

As a trial run for 2014 Women's Rugby World Cup, United States faced Italy for the first time ever and France during a seven-day period.

England vs France

Assistant referees:
n/a
n/a
Assessor:
n/a

Italy vs United States

Assistant referees:
Barbara Guastini (Italy)
Federica Guerzoni (Italy)
Assessor:
Beatrice Benvenuti (Italy)

France vs United States (1st match)

Assistant referees:
n/a
n/a
Assessor:
n/a

England vs New Zealand (1st match)

Assistant referees:
Phil Bowers (England)
Ken Morgan (England)
Assessor:
Fergus Kirby (England)

France vs United States (2nd match)

Assistant referees:
n/a
n/a
Assessor:
n/a

England vs New Zealand (2nd match)

Assistant referees:
Sara Cox (England)
Tim Bailey (England)
Assessor:
Keith Page (England)

England vs New Zealand (3rd match)

Assistant referees:
Philip Davies (England)
Dino Maddern (England)
Assessor:
Steve Leyshon (England)

Italy vs Spain

Assistant referees:
Monia Salvini (Italy)
Federica Guerzoni (Italy)
Assessor:
n/a

Notes

2012 in women's rugby union
women
Women's rugby union matches
2012–13 in European women's rugby union
2012 in New Zealand rugby union
2012 in New Zealand women's sport
2012 in American rugby union
2012 in American women's sports